Hockey at the 1984 Olympics may refer to:

Ice hockey at the 1984 Winter Olympics
Field hockey at the 1984 Summer Olympics